Mount Mummery is a  glaciated double summit mountain located in the Canadian Rockies of British Columbia, Canada. It is the highest point in the Mummery Group, and fourth-highest in the Freshfield Icefield Ranges. The mountain was named in 1898 by J. Norman Collie after Albert F. Mummery (1855-1895), a famous British mountaineer who perished attempting to climb Nanga Parbat in the Himalayas. Collie named many peaks in the Canadian Rockies, and was a climbing companion who accompanied Mummery on the Nanga Parbat expedition. Around the same time, nearby Nanga Parbat Mountain was also named by Collie. Mount Mummery's name was officially adopted March 31, 1924, when approved by the Geographical Names Board of Canada. The first ascent of the mountain was made in 1906 by I. Tucker Burr Jr, Samuel Cabot Jr, W. Rodman Peabody, Robert Walcott, with guides Gottfried Feuz and Christian Kaufmann.

Climate
Based on the Köppen climate classification, Mount Mummery is located in a subarctic climate zone with cold, snowy winters, and mild summers. Temperatures can drop below  with wind chill factors below . Precipitation runoff from the mountain and meltwater from the Mummery Glacier drains into Blaeberry River and Waitabit Creek, which are both tributaries of the Columbia River.

See also
 Geology of the Rocky Mountains
 List of mountains in the Canadian Rockies

References

External links
 Weather: Mount Mummery

Three-thousanders of British Columbia
Canadian Rockies
Columbia Country
Kootenay Land District